Noor-E-Hasna Lily Chowdhury is a Jatiya Party (Ershad) politician and the former Member of Bangladesh Parliament from a reserved seat.

Early life
Chowdhury was born on 1 January 1945. She has a B.A. degree.

Career
Chowdhury was elected to parliament from reserved seat as a Jatiya Party (Ershad) candidate in 2014.

References

Jatiya Party politicians
Living people
1945 births
Women members of the Jatiya Sangsad
8th Jatiya Sangsad members
10th Jatiya Sangsad members
21st-century Bangladeshi women politicians
21st-century Bangladeshi politicians